Howard Hunter Turner (May 4, 1897 – November 17, 1976) was an American football back who played one season with the Milwaukee Badgers of the National Football League. He played college football at Lombard College. The Jim Turner listed on other sites as having played for the Badgers in 1923 did not likely play for the team.

Professional career

Milwaukee Badgers
Turner signed with the Milwaukee Badgers in October 1923 and played in three games, starting two, for the team during the 1923 season.

Coaching career
Turner later became a high school football coach in Roseburg, Oregon.

References

External links
 Just Sports Stats

1897 births
1976 deaths
American football defensive backs
American football running backs
Lombard Olive football players
Milwaukee Badgers players
High school football coaches in Oregon
People from Macomb, Illinois
Sportspeople from Roseburg, Oregon
Players of American football from Illinois